NGC 1293 is an elliptical galaxy located about 215 million light-years away in the constellation Perseus. It was discovered by astronomer William Herschel on October 17, 1786. NGC 1293 is a member of the Perseus Cluster.

See also
 List of NGC objects (1001–2000)
 NGC 1283

References

External links
 

Perseus Cluster
Perseus (constellation)
Elliptical galaxies
1293
012597 
Astronomical objects discovered in 1786